"Still Disappointed" (stylised in all uppercase) is a song by English rapper Stormzy. It was released as a single on 10 January 2020. It is Stormzy's second diss track aimed at rapper Wiley. The song peaked at number 21 on the UK Singles Chart.

Background
On Stormzy's previous single "Disappointed", he branded Wiley a 'crackhead cunt'. This came after Wiley said Stormzy was 'worse than Ed Sheeran' on his own song, "Eediyat Skengman". In response, on 8 January Wiley released the single "Eediyat Skengman 2" which sees the rapper take aim at Stormzy's mother. Which resulted in Stormzy releasing the single "Still Disappointed".

Music video
A music video to accompany the release of "Still Disappointed" was first released onto YouTube on 8 January 2020.

Charts

Certifications

Release history

References

2020 songs
2020 singles
Stormzy songs
Diss tracks
Songs written by Stormzy